Elizabeth "Liz" Appleby (born November 25, 1958) is a Canadian speed skater. She competed in three events at the 1976 Winter Olympics.

In 1986, Appleby was inducted into the Manitoba Sports Hall of Fame.

References

1958 births
Living people
Canadian female speed skaters
Olympic speed skaters of Canada
Speed skaters at the 1976 Winter Olympics
Speed skaters from Winnipeg
Manitoba Sports Hall of Fame inductees
20th-century Canadian women